Giusti is an Italian surname.

Variations 

 Iustis in Latin
Zufto/Zusto in Venetian
Giusto/Giusti in Italian
 de' Giusti / de Giusti / De Giusti -- The "de" particle is used as the nobiliary particle.  Note the writing at the bottom of Giovanni Battista Giusti's coat of arms found in the Palazzo della Caravan on the image in the side.  In the partial writing of the name, it is written as "... Baptista De Iustis De Colle ...".
Giusti del Giardino
 Giusti or Juste in French
 Justo in Spanish

Origin 

 Originally came from Colle di Valle d'Elsa.  
 Migrated to Florence where, in addition to citizenship, they were entrusted with distinguished charges and functions.
Around this time, there is also a migration to Padua.
 In 1141 they then moved to Venice and were integrated into the Venetian nobility as a patrician family.
 They played a part in the election of Orio Mastropiero.
 However, the family was excluded at the closing of the Maggior Consiglio.
 Around 1311, Gumberto or Gomberto de Giusti migrates to Verona at the time of Cangrande I della Scala.
 Lelio Giusti becomes the Podestà of Florence and Ambassador to the Doge Pasquale Malipiero.
 Lorenzo Giusti reinstated their nobility, when they were excluded from the Maggior Consiglio, after the war in Genoa.
 In 1502 the Venetian Republic, under Leonardo Loredan, grants them Dukedoms.
 They receive the title of Counts of the land and castle of Gazzo.
 In 1600 the title was confirmed by Emperor Rodolfo II.
 In 1611 they were elected Roman citizens in the order of patricians and Senators.
 In 1615 Giacomo Giusti was one of the four captains of the Venetian militia enlisted by the Republic on occasion of disturbances in Italy.
 In 1620 they obtained the confirmation of the ancient nobility with the title of Counts of Gazzo and Venetian patricians.

Geographical distribution
Broken down by Giusti and de Giusti.

Giusti 
As of 2014, 61.8% of all known bearers of the surname Giusti were residents of Italy (frequency 1:2,776), 13.8% of Brazil (1:41,500), 7.6% of the United States (1:133,747), 6.9% of Argentina (1:17,375) and 4.4% of France (1:42,362).

In Italy, the frequency of the surname was higher than the national average (1:2,776) in the following regions:
 1. Tuscany (1:339)
 2. Emilia-Romagna (1:1,964)
 3. Abruzzo (1:2,265)
 4. Marche (1:2,318)
 5. Lazio (1:2,520)

de Giusti 
As of 2014, 71.3% of all known bearers of the surname de Giusti were residents of Italy (frequency 1:75,409), 16.5% of Argentina (1:227,359), 3.7% of Brazil (1:5,097,008), 2.5% of France (1:2,372,240), 2.0% of Venezuela (1:1,313,221), 1.9% of Australia (1:1,227,077), 1.1% of Canada (1:3,070,466), and 0.3% of United States (1:120,819,644).

In Italy, the frequency of the surname was higher than the national average (1:75,409) in the following regions:

 Friuli-Venezia Giulia (1:10,265)
Veneto (1:15,740)
Lazio (1:17,799)

Palaces 

 Palace of Miana Colette Giusti in Venice
Palace of Giusti in Verona
Villa Giusti del Giardino in Padua

People 
14th century
 Gomberto or Gumberto de Giusti (1311)
Dondedeo de' Giusti (1343), Italian consular of Caffa for the Republic of Genoa

15th century
 Lelio Giusti (1458), Podestà of Florence

16-18th century
 Agostino Giusti (1548-1615), Italian diplomat in the service of the Medici and the Republic of Venice
 Antonio Giusti (1624–1705), Italian painter
Giacomo Giusti (1615), one of four captains of the Venetian militia enlisted by the Republic on occasions of disturbances in Italy 
 Giovanni Battista Giusti (16th century), Italian scientific-instrument maker
 Alvise Giusti (1709–1766), Italian lawyer, poet, and opera librettist
 Girolamo Giusti (1703 – ?), Italian opera librettist
 Luigi (Alvise) Giusti (1709–1766), Italian lawyer, poet, and librettist, nephew of Girolamo Giusti
His Excellency, the Baron de Giusti (1802), an Italian Baron in Genoa who corresponds with Napoleon

19-21st century
Giuseppe Giusti (1809–1850), Italian poet and satirist
Antonino Russo Giusti (1876-1957), Italian dramatist
Guglielmo Giusti (born 1937), Sammarinese former sports shooter
Renato Giusti (born 1938), Italian racing cyclist
Dave Giusti (born 1939), American Major League Baseball pitcher
Enrico Giusti (born 1940), Italian mathematician and historian
Paolo Giusti (1942-2020), French actor
Ricardo Giusti (born 1956), former Argentinian footballer
Kathy Giusti (born 1958), American health care entrepreneur, president of the Multiple Myeloma Research Foundation
Timothy D. DeGiusti (born 1962), United States District Judge of the United States District Court for the Western District of Oklahoma
Walter De Giusti (1962-1988), Argentine spree killer
Stéphane Giusti (1964), French director and actress
María Elena Giusti (born 1968), Venezuelan synchronized swimmer
Bernard De Giusti (1972), a former rugby union player
Jenilca Giusti (born 1981), Puerto Rican singer, songwriter and actress commonly known as Jenilca
Maximiliano Giusti (1991–2016), Argentine football player
 Carlos Eduardo Bendini Giusti (born 1993), Brazilian professional football defender
 Karin Giusti, Italian sculptor and installation artist
 Roberto Giusti, Venezuelan journalist
 Silvia Giusti, former Argentine Senator for Chubut Province

Companies 

 Miari & Giusti is an Italian automobile brand, founded in Padua in 1894.
De Giusti Orgoglio is an Italian company in San Vendemiano (TV) that sells prosecco and coffee.

References

Italian-language surnames
Surnames of Italian origin

de:Giusti
es:Giusti
fr:Giusti
it:Giusto (cognome)
ja:ジュスティ
ru:Джусти
sr:Giusti
sh:Giusti